Wiremu Piti Pomare (? – 29 January 1851) was a New Zealand Māori leader. Of Māori descent, he identified with the Ngati Mutunga iwi.

References

1851 deaths
Ngāti Mutunga people
Year of birth missing